The 2013 women's road cycling season was the first year of the team Wiggle–Honda.

Roster

Season
On March 3 the team achieved its first ever victory when Emily Collins won the Omloop van het Hageland one day race in Belgium. Collins Shelly Olds (Team TIBCO) and Emma Johansson (Orica–AIS) in a final sprint. On May 18 the team earned its first overall General classification win at the Tour of Zhoushan Island in China where Giorgia Bronzini took overall victory from the Hitec Products UCK pairing of Elisa Longo Borghini and Cecille Gotaas Johnsen by 14 seconds and 1 minute 6 seconds respectively. The team's second overall victory came at the 2013 La Route de France, where Linda Villumsen won stage 7 and in doing so took overall victory from Emma Johansson by 5 minutes 52 seconds. The race will be remembered for the record breaking efforts of Bronzini who won six consecutive stages (1–6) breaking the all-time record for consecutive stage wins in a women's stage racing and meaning that the team won all 7 road stages. The team finished the season 5th in the UCI Rankings (1060 points) and 7th in the Women's World Cup rankings (166 points).

Season victories

Results in major races

Single day races

Grand Tours

UCI World Ranking

The team finished fifth in the UCI ranking for teams.

References

2013 UCI Women's Teams seasons
2013 in Dutch sport
2013 in women's road cycling
Wiggle Honda